Boureima Ouattara (born 13 January 1984) is a Burkinabé former professional footballer who played as a centre-back for ASF Bobo Dioulasso, Strømsgodset Toppfotball, and CA Bastia.

He was part of the Burkinabé 2002 African Nations Cup team, which finished bottom of group B in the first round of competition, thus failing to secure qualification for the quarter-finals. He also featured at the 2003 FIFA World Youth Championship.

References

External links

1984 births
Living people
Burkinabé footballers
Association football defenders
Burkina Faso international footballers
ASF Bobo Dioulasso players
CA Bastia players
Strømsgodset Toppfotball players
2002 African Cup of Nations players
Burkinabé expatriate footballers
Expatriate footballers in Norway
Expatriate footballers in France
Burkinabé expatriate sportspeople in Norway
Burkinabé expatriate sportspeople in France
21st-century Burkinabé people